The Caribbean Union of Teachers (CUT) is a federation of teaching trade unions in the Caribbean. Its affiliated unions are:
 Anguilla Teachers Union
 Antigua & Barbuda Union of Teachers
 Bahamas Union of Teachers
 Barbados Secondary Teachers Union
 Barbados Union of Teachers
 Belize National Teachers Union
 Bermuda Union of Teachers
 British Virgin Islands Teachers Union
 Dominica Association of Teachers
 Grenada Union of Teachers
 Guyana Teachers' Union
 Jamaica Teachers Association
 Montserrat Union of Teachers
 Nevis Teachers Union
 St. Kitts Teachers Union
 St. Lucia Teachers Union
St. Vincent & the Grenadines Teachers Union
Syndicat Des Enseignants (Martinique)
Syndicat national de l'enseignement secondaire SNES (Martinique)
Trinidad and Tobago Unified Teachers Association
Windward Islands Teachers Union

See also

 List of trade unions

External links
Caribbean Union of Teachers

Education-related professional associations
Education trade unions